Elke Karin "Elżbieta" Morciniec (born 21 October 1943) is a Polish equestrian. She was born in Wrocław. She competed in dressage at the 1980 Summer Olympics in Moscow, where she placed fourth in the team competition with the Polish team (together with Józef Zagor and Wanda Wąsowska).

References

External links

1943 births
Living people
Sportspeople from Wrocław
Polish female equestrians
Polish dressage riders
Olympic equestrians of Poland
Equestrians at the 1980 Summer Olympics